Hirakud Power Plant is a coal based captive thermal power plant located near Hirakud in Sambalpur district in the Indian state of Odisha. The power plant began  commercial production in April 2013, is operated by the Hindalco Industries. The plant supplies power to Hirakud smelter of Hindalco Industries. The coal for the plant is sourced from Talabira captive coal mines.

Capacity
It has an installed capacity of 467.5 MW. The plant is functional.

References

Coal-fired power stations in Odisha
Buildings and structures in Sambalpur district
Hindalco Industries
2013 establishments in Odisha
Energy infrastructure completed in 2013